Brescianino (= person from Brescia, Italy) has been given as a nickname to:

Painters
 Giovita Brescianino
 Francesco Monti (il Brescianino) (1646–1712) 
 Andrea Piccinelli or Andrea del Brescianino, or simply Il Brescianino, Sienese painter
 Raffaello Piccinelli or Raffaello del Brescianino, Sienese painter, brother of the above